Gorgeous may refer to:

Animals
Gorgeous barb, a species of cyprinid fish native to Africa
Gorgeous bushshrike, a bird in the family Malaconotidae
Gorgeous prawn goby, a species of goby native to tropical reefs of the Indian Ocean to the western Pacific Ocean

Film
Gorgeous (film), a 1999 film starring Jackie Chan
Gorgeous Enterprises, a London-based film production company

Music
The Gorgeous, a Canadian rock band

Albums
Gorgeous (808 State album), 1993
Gorgeous (Guttermouth album), 1999
Gorgeous (EP), by F.Cuz, 2010

Songs
"Gorgeous" (Kanye West song), 2010
"Gorgeous" (Taylor Swift song), 2017
"Gorgeous", from the play The Apple Tree, 1966
"Gorgeous", by Alanis Morissette from Jagged Little Pill (20th Anniversary Edition), 2015
"Gorgeous", by Eighteen Visions from Vanity, 2002
"Gorgeous", by Idina Menzel from I Stand, 2008
"Gorgeous", by Illenium from Ascend, 2019
"Gorgeous", by Jeffree Star from Beauty Killer, 2009
"Gorgeous", by Saint Jhn, 2020
"Gorgeous", by Slowthai from Nothing Great About Britain, 2019

People
Gorgeous (owarai) (born 1978), Japanese comedian
Vincent Basciano (born 1959), nicknamed Vinny Gorgeous, American mobster
Jimmy Garvin (born 1952), ring name "Gorgeous" Jimmy Garvin, American retired professional wrestler
Gigi Gorgeous (born 1992), Canadian internet personality, actress, and model

See also
Physical attractiveness
Gorgeous George (disambiguation)

Jorgeous